The fast food industry in India has evolved with the changing lifestyles of the young Indian population. The variety of gastronomic preferences across the regions, hereditary or acquired, has brought about different modules across the country. 

Many of the traditional dishes have been adapted to suit the emerging fast food outlets. The basic adaptation is to decrease the processing and serving time. For example, the typical meal which called for being served by an ever-alert attendant is now offered as a Mini-Meal across the counter. In its traditional version, a plate or a banana leaf was first laid down on the floor or table. Several helpers then waited on the diner, doling out different dishes and refilling as they got over in the plate.

In the fast-food version, a plate already arranged with a variety of cooked vegetables and curries along with a fixed quantity of rice and Indian flatbreads is handed out across the counter against a prepaid coupon. The curries and breads vary depending on the region and local preferences. The higher priced ones may add a sweet to the combination. Refills are generally not offered.

Styles
It is common to serve different cuisines at different counters within the same premises. Presence of a large vegetarian population, who eschew non-vegetarian food, has given rise to outlets which exclusively serve vegetarian fast food. Also, different variety of food may be served depending on the times of the day. Beverages such coffee, tea, soft drinks and fruit juices may also be served in such outlets. Some outlets may additionally have specially designed counters for ice-cream, chaats etc.

Popular formats of fast food business in India have the following features in common:

 Wide opening on the roadside
 Easy to maintain and durable décor
 A cash counter where food coupons are sold
 A food delivery counter which invariably is granite topped
 Additional counters for Ice Creams, Chaats, Beverages etc.
 A well fitted kitchen located so as to be visible to the customers
 Tall tables, typically of stainless steel, where one can eat while standing
 A drinking water fountain adorned with a water filter
 Rust-proof and non-breakable crockery

Most of the fast food outlets in India are stand alone establishment, few of them having more than one branch.

Food courts
Another concept of fast food that is becoming popular is that of Food Courts. Here also one has to purchase coupons and collect the food from one of the several counters. Each one of these counters serves specific variety of food and may be owned by different individuals or caterers. Food Courts are normally located on much bigger premises and may provide seating facility in addition to the stand and eat arrangement. Typically one entrepreneur owns or takes on lease the entire premises and promotes the place under one name. They then let out individual counters to different independent operators to offer different menu. Internal competition is avoided by not allowing more than one counter to offer similar food.

Several international fast-food chains like Kentucky Fried Chicken, McDonald's, and Barista Coffee have their outlets in major cities. Café Coffee Day, again a brainchild of Bangalore-based businessman, is the only Indian chain which boasts of hundreds of outlets and is present across India. But then it is classified more as a coffee shop than a fast food place.

Now local chains coupled with numerous foreign fast foods have sprung up in India, leading to many websites not only catering to the curated list of foods, restaurants and reviews but also giving option to book and get it delivered at your doorsteps.

Varieties of food offered
The kind of fare they offer as of date could be just anything and everything. Preference of the local population and the location of the outlet influence the menu more than anything else. Some of the popular dishes offered at Indian fast food outlets are:

Western Indian
 Vada pav – a deep-fried potato (vada) sandwiched in a bread bun (pav)
 Misal pav – cooked sprouted lentils and farsan in a spicy gravy
 Pav bhaji – a thick vegetable curry (bhaji) served with a soft bread roll (pav)
 Khaman –  a Gujarati snack that is made from fresh daal or gram flour
 Samosa – a fried or baked pastry with a savory filling, including ingredients such as spiced potatoes, onions, and peas
 Usal – a Maharastrian dish made of legumes such as peas, lentils, black-eyed beans, Matki, Moong, or Hyacinth beans
 Khandvi – Khandvi
 Gathiya – Bhavanagar gathiya, Gathiya
 Jalebi – Kesar jalebi, Desi ghee jalebi
 Poha – Masa Poha, Kanda poha, Usal poha
 Puff – Masala Puff, Cheese Puff
 Shahi tukda - A bread pudding sweet
 Bread Tikki - A spicy dish made using bread, potato and spices.

South Indian
 Idli – Rice Idli, Rava Idli
 Vada – Uddina Vada, Rava Vada, Masala Vada, Maddur Vada
 Dosa - Masala Dosa, Set Dosa, Rava Dosa
 Upma, Kesaribhath
 Puliyogare
 Pongal
 Vangibath
 Vegetable Bonda
 Chaat
 Poori

Others
 Bonda Soup
 Pohay
 Bhajji – Banana Bhajji, Green Chili Bhajji
 Pakora – Onion Pakora, Vegetable Pakora
 Thali - vegetable, chicken, mutton
 Rajma rice
 Indian Chinese cuisine
 Pasta
 Burger (chicken, mutton, veg)
 Wraps & rolls
 Chaat
 Grilled chicken
 Samosa, patties(E.g. Ragda pattice), bread pakoda
 Dabeli
 Doner kebab
 Dum biryani
 Fish and chips
 Salads
 Fruit beer
 Mutar kulcha
 Pao bhaji
 Stuffed paratha
 Fruit salad
 Idli sambar
 Vada sambar
 Dahi wada
Bhajiya
 Mini Meals
 Chapati and sabji
 koalcha 
 Momos

Beverages
 Coffee
 Tea
 Lassi
 Fruit punch 
 Cold Drinks
 Fresh fruit juice
 Milkshake
 Mocktails
 Sugarcane juice
 Soup (Hot Beverage)

References

 
Fast food
Fast food